Lý Hoàng Sơn (born June 2, 1990) is a Vietnamese professional basketball player who currently plays for the Saigon Heat of the ASEAN Basketball League (ABL).

Pro career

Saigon Heat
In 2012, Hoàng Sơn joined the Heat before the club's inaugural season in the ABL.

References

External links
 Career statistics and player information from ASEANBasketballLeague.com

1985 births
Living people
Vietnamese basketball players
Saigon Heat players
Small forwards
People from Sóc Trăng province